The discography of rap rock artist Deuce includes two studio albums, four extended plays, one mixtape, eleven singles, and ten music videos.

Solo

Studio albums

Extended plays

Mixtapes

Singles
As lead artist

As featured artist

Music videos
As lead artist

As featured artist

With Hollywood Undead

Studio albums

Live albums

Extended plays

Singles

Music videos

References

Discographies of American artists
Rap rock discographies